Liang Xi (died 230), courtesy name Ziyu, was an official of the state of Cao Wei during the Three Kingdoms period of China. He was from Zhe County, Chen Commandery, which is around present-day Zhecheng County, Henan. He served as the Inspector of Bing Province. At one time, he achieved compliance from the Xiongnu to then settle the frontier and to launch an agricultural sericulture (silk production from silkworm) industry.

He was later promoted to the position of Minister of Finance in 228.

See also
 Lists of people of the Three Kingdoms

Notes

References

 Chen, Shou (3rd century). Records of the Three Kingdoms (Sanguozhi).
 Pei, Songzhi (5th century). Annotations to Records of the Three Kingdoms (Sanguozhi zhu).

Year of birth unknown
230 deaths
Cao Wei politicians
Politicians from Shangqiu
Political office-holders in Shanxi